The 2021 Women's FA Cup Final was the 51st final of the Women's FA Cup, England's primary cup competition for women's football teams. The showpiece event was the 27th to be played directly under the auspices of the Football Association (FA) and was named the Vitality Women's FA Cup Final due to sponsorship reasons. 

The final was contested between Arsenal and Chelsea on 5 December 2021 at Wembley Stadium in London and broadcast on BBC1. Chelsea won 3–0 in front of a crowd of 40,942 to clinch their third title.

Originally scheduled to be played in May 2021, the match was delayed by the COVID-19 pandemic in the United Kingdom. The alternative date in December was chosen to symbolically coincide with the 100 year anniversary of the FA's infamous ruling to ban women's football from the grounds of all its affiliated clubs.

Match

Details

References

External links
 
 Report at WomensFACup.co.uk

Cup
Women's FA Cup finals
Women's FA Cup Final
Women's FA Cup Final
Women's FA Cup Final
FA Women's Cup Final, 2021
FA Women's Cup Final 2021